The School of Dentistry is a dental school within Meharry Medical College located in the United States city of Nashville, Tennessee.

History 
Meharry Medical College School of Dentistry is a part of Meharry Medical College. The school was established in 1886.

Academics 
Meharry Medical College School of Dentistry awards following degrees:
Doctor of Dental Surgery

DDS Program
Bio-medical Science based, spanning a length of four years leading to a Doctor of Dental Surgery degree. 
During the first two years, dental students take medical science courses along with students at the Meharry Medical College at the Harold Dadford West Basic Sciences Center. The final two years entails a curriculum of comprehensive clinical care.

Facilities 
Meharry Medical College School of Dentistry is located on 1005 Doctor D B Todd Junior Boulevard, Nashville, TN. The College, houses patient clinics, research and teaching facilities, educational programs, and administrative offices. The operatories are designed in modules, each containing a waiting room, offices, X-ray facilities, and a seminar room for instruction and consultation. These facilities enable the College to provide oral health care for Tennesseans.

Graduate programs
Meharry Medical dental college offers an Advanced Education Program in  Oral and Maxillofacial Surgery, Department of Oral and Maxillofacial Surgery, School of Dentistry, Meharry Medical College is fully accredited by the Commission on Dental Accreditation of the American Dental Association. The college also offers a program in General Practice Residency (GPR), available for dentists seriously desiring to enhance their knowledge and clinical skill in all aspects of general dentistry.

Departments 
Meharry Medical College School of Dentistry includes the following departments:
Dental Public Health
Endodontics
Oral Biology & Research
Oral and Maxillofacial Surgery
Oral Diagnostic Sciences
Pediatric Dentistry & Orthodontics
Periodontics
Restorative Dentistry (Prosthodontics and Operative Dentistry)

Gallery

Accreditation 
Meharry Medical College School of Dentistry is currently accredited by ADA

See also

American Student Dental Association

References 

Dental schools in Tennessee
Meharry Medical College